Nicolas Mordvinoff (September 27, 1911–1973) was a Russian-born American artist who won the 1952 Caldecott Medal for U.S. picture book illustration, recognizing Finders Keepers, by William Lipkind. The collaborators used the pseudonym Nicolas and Will.

One earlier work was William Standish Stone, Pépé was the saddest bird, Knopf, 1944

References

Caldecott Medal winners
American children's book illustrators
1911 births
1973 deaths
Emigrants from the Russian Empire to the United States